Debra L. Reed (born 1957) is an American businesswoman who served as the CEO of Sempra Energy from 2011 until her retirement in 2018. She was the first female CEO of Sempra Energy, a Fortune 500 energy services holding company based in San Diego, California.

Early life 
Reed was born and raised in Southern California.

Education
In 1978, Reed earned her BS in Civil Engineering (summa cum laude) from the University of Southern California. In 1986, she received her license for Engineer in Training.

Career
Reed served as chairman of the board of directors of Sempra Energy from 2012-2018 and chief executive officer of Sempra Energy from 2011-2018.  She was promoted from her previous role as executive vice president at the firm.   Before moving into the management of Sempra Energy, Reed was chief financial officer and thereafter (2006 to 2010) President and CEO of two Sempra subsidiaries, San Diego Gas & Electric and Southern California Gas Co (SoCalGas). She retired in 2018 and was replaced by Jeffrey Martin.

In her role at Sempra, Reed presided over $37bn in assets, operated revenues of $10+bn and 17,000 employees. Reed started at SoCalGas in 1978.    Her total compensation for 2013 $9,792,288 and her stock ownership for 2014, 57,762.

Business achievements
In 1988, Reed became SoCalGas’s first female officer. She was one of few female 500 CEOs from the Fortune 500 companies.

Business awards
In 2014, Reed was appointed by the U.S. Secretary of Energy to the National Petroleum Council. Fortune Magazine has named her to its list of "Most Powerful Women in Business" six consecutive times, ranking her #23 in 2015 and #22 in 2016.

Board memberships
Reed is a member of the board of directors of Halliburton Co., the Board of Councilors of the University of Southern California Viterbi School of Engineering, Chairman’s Competitiveness Council, The Trusteeship and The Business Council.

In the past, Reed was chairman of the San Diego Regional Economic Development Corporation, a member of the board of directors of Genentech and Avery Dennison Corp.

On April 8, 2015, Caterpillar Inc. announced that Reed had been nominated to join the board of directors, with election to be held at the June 2015 annual stockholders meeting.

Personal life
Reed lives with her husband in San Diego. They have one daughter.

References

American women chief executives
American chief executives of Fortune 500 companies
American chief financial officers
Sempra Energy
1957 births
Living people
USC Viterbi School of Engineering alumni
Women chief financial officers
21st-century American women